Wilson Creek is a  long 1st order tributary to Herring Creek in Sussex County, Delaware.

Course
Wilson Creek rises on the Lingo Creek divide, about 0.1 miles southeast of Rehoboth Shores in Sussex County, Delaware.  Wilson Creek then flows northeast to meet Herring Creek about 0.25 miles north of Rehoboth Shores.

Watershed
Wilson Creek drains  of area, receives about 44.9 in/year of precipitation, has a topographic wetness index of 588.33 and is about 16.3% forested.

See also
List of rivers of Delaware

References 

Rivers of Delaware